SMS Wolf (formerly the Hansa freighter Wachtfels) was an armed merchant raider or auxiliary cruiser of the Imperial German Navy in World War I. She was the fourth ship of the Imperial Navy bearing this name (and is therefore often referred to in Germany as Wolf IV), following two gunboats and another auxiliary cruiser that was decommissioned without seeing action.

Description and history
As a commerce raider, the Wolf was equipped with six  guns, three  SK L/55 guns and several smaller caliber weapons as well as four torpedo tubes. She also carried over 450 mines to be dropped outside enemy ports; she laid minefields in the Indian Ocean and off Australia's southern coast which claimed several ships. Her commander was Fregattenkapitän (Commander) Karl August Nerger who was in charge until her return to Kiel, Germany in February 1918.

The Wolf had not been designed for speed and her top speed was a mere . Her advantages included deception (fake funnel and masts which could be erected or lowered to change her appearance), false sides which kept her weapons hidden until the last possible moment, and a range of over  thanks to a coal bunker capacity of 8,000 tons (assuming a cruise speed of 8 knots, burning 35 tons of coal daily).

On 30 November 1916 the Wolf left her home port of Kiel with a crew of 348 men. She dropped mines at the harbors of Colombo and Bombay, then entered the waters of South Asia, Australia and New Zealand.

With the help of the "Wölfchen" (Wolf Cub), a Friedrichshafen FF.33e two-seater seaplane, she located and seized enemy vessels and cargo ships. After transferring their crews and any valuable supplies (notably coal, but also essential metals of which the German war effort had much need) to the Wolf, she then sank the vessels. The Wolf destroyed 35 trading vessels and two war ships, altogether approximately 110,000 tons.

After 451 days she returned to her home port of Kiel on 24 February 1918 with 467 prisoners of war aboard. In addition she carried substantial quantities of rubber, copper, zinc, brass, silk, copra, cocoa, and other essential materials taken from her prizes. The Wolf, without support of any kind, had made the longest voyage of a warship during World War I. Captain Nerger was awarded the highest German decoration, the Pour le Mérite.

For the remainder of the war, the Wolf was employed in the Baltic Sea. After the war she was ceded to France and sold to Compagnie des Messageries Maritimes of Paris, refitted and renamed Antinous. She was scrapped in 1931 in Italy.

A member of the crew was the young Theodor Plivier, who became later a revolutionary, communist, and famous author. In his first novel Des Kaisers Kulis (The emperor's coolies) he assimilates his experience on board the Wolf. The book was transformed in a theatrical play, too, and forbidden after the National Socialist Machtergreifung. Another crew member was Jakob Kinau, brother of author Gorch Fock – Kinau served as a Minenbootsmannsmaat on the Wolf. In his voyage diary, which was published in 1934 in the Quickborn-Verlag, Hamburg, he mentioned some details of a mutiny on board, which was not described in memoirs of other Wolf crew.

The  was sunk off the coast of the South Island of New Zealand after hitting a mine laid by the Wolf.

Summary of raiding history
In 15 months at sea, Wolf captured and sank 14 ships, totalling 38,391 GRT. She also laid minefields that sank another 13 ships, grossing a further . The heaviest loss was the Spanish mail steamer  on the way from Cadiz to Manila. It struck a mine laid by Wolf near Cape Town and sunk in only four minutes. 134 people, including 12 women and five children, died. 24 persons survived.

In addition, on 6.2.17, the British troopship HMT Tyndareus was badly damaged by one of Wolf's mines off Cape Town and was only saved from sinking by skillful seamanship.

Film 
In February/March 1918 the Bild- und Filmamt (BUFA) produced the 13 minutes silent movie S.M. Hilfskreuzer "Wolf", which was produced in Kiel. It shows, beside from Portuguese Army officers, soldiers or officers from New Zealand or Australia as prisoners of war of the "Wolf".

Gallery

References

Bibliography 

Alexander, Roy, The Cruise of the Raider Wolf, Yale University Press, 1939.
 
Donaldson, A., The Amazing Cruise of the German Raider Wolf, New Century Press, Sydney, 1918.
Fritz Witschetzky Das schwarze Schiff, Union Deutsche Verlagsgesellschaft, Stuttgart/Berlin/Leipzig, 1920.
Frederic George Trayes, Five Months on a German Raider: Being the Adventures of an Englishman Captured by the "Wolf" , London : Headley, 1919.
Guilliatt, Richard & Peter Hohnen, The Wolf: How One German Raider Terrorized the Allies in the Most Epic Voyage of WWI, William Heinemann Publ., Australia, 2009. 
Hoyt, Edwin P.,  Raider Wolf, The Voyage of Captain Nerger, 1916-1918, New York, 1974. 
Kinau, Jakob, Der Adjutant des Todes. Wolfs-Tagebuch, (Quickborn-Verlag), Hamburg 1934.
Leimbach, Fritz, 64 000 Seemeilen Kaperfahrt. Erlebnisse eines Matrosen auf dem Hilfskreuzer "Wolf", Berlin (West-Ost-Verlag) 1937, Onlineversion: , Reprint by Maritimepress 2012. 
Julio Molina Font: Cádiz y el vapor-correo de Filipinas "Carlos de Eizaguirre", 1904 - 1917. Historia de un naufragio (Cadiz and the Philippine mail steamer "Carlos de Eizaguirre". History of a shipwreck), 2. expanded ed. Cádiz (Universidad de Cádiz, Servicio de Publicaciones) 2007. 
Nerger, Karl August, S.M.S. Wolf, Scherl Verlag Berlin, 1918.
Plivier, Theodor, Des Kaiser Kulis. Roman der deutschen Kriegsflotte, Berlin 1930.
Schmalenbach, Paul; German Raiders: A History of Auxiliary Cruisers of the German Navy, 1895-1945, Naval Institute Press, 1979. 
 - Total pages: 292

External links 

Report on the voyage of the Wolf
TV-Interview with the author of the book "The Wolf"
Website of the book The Wolf 
S.M. Hilfskreuzer "Wolf", silent movie, full length, at Bundesarchiv-Filmarchiv

World War I commerce raiders
Wolf (IV)
Military attacks against Australia
Ships built in Flensburg
1913 ships
Auxiliary cruisers of the Imperial German Navy